Bush Barrow is a site of the early British Bronze Age Wessex culture (c. 2000 BC), at the western end of the Normanton Down Barrows cemetery. It is among the most important sites of the Stonehenge complex, having produced some of the most spectacular grave goods in Britain. It was excavated in 1808 by  William Cunnington for Sir Richard Colt Hoare. The finds, including worked gold objects, are displayed at Wiltshire Museum in Devizes.

Description 

Bush Barrow is situated around 1 kilometre southwest of Stonehenge on Normanton Down. It forms part of the Normanton Down Barrows cemetery. The barrow currently stands 3.3 metres high and its summit measures 10.5 metres in diameter.

The barrow is one of the "associated sites" in the World Heritage Site covering Stonehenge, Avebury and Associated Sites (Cultural, ID 373, 1986). The Normanton Down round barrow cemetery comprises some 40 barrows strung out along an east-west aligned ridge. Bush Barrow (so named by Cunnington because it had bushes on it) is towards the western end of the line of barrows, sited at the highest point of the ridge.

Contents 

The barrow was excavated in 1808 by William Cunnington for Sir Richard Colt Hoare. It contained a male skeleton with a collection of funerary goods that make it "the richest and most significant example of a Bronze Age burial monument not only in the Normanton Group or in association with Stonehenge, but arguably in the whole of Britain". The items date the burial to the early Bronze Age, circa 1900 BC, and include a large 'lozenge'-shaped sheet of gold, a sheet gold belt plate, three bronze daggers, a bronze axe, a stone macehead and bronze rivets, all on display at the Wiltshire Museum, Devizes.

Bush Barrow Lozenge 
The design of the artifact known as the Bush Barrow Lozenge, and the smaller lozenge, has been shown to be based on a hexagon construction. Both the shape and the decorative panels appear to have been created by repeating hexagons within a series of three concentric circles (each framing the series of smaller decorative panels). The precision and accuracy displayed by the work demonstrates both a sophisticated tool kit and a sound knowledge of geometric form. A similar gold lozenge from Clandon Barrow, in Dorset, used a decagon in its design. 

The design of the Bush Barrow Lozenge also indicates that it has an astronomical meaning. The acute angles of the overall design (81°) are equal to the angle between the midsummer and midwinter solstice sunrises, as seen at the latitude of Stonehenge. A similar feature is seen on the contemporary Nebra sky disc, where the angle formed by the gold arcs on the edge of the disc (82°) is equal to the angle between the solstices at the latitude of the Mittelberg hill where the disc was found. John North (1996) suggests that the angles of the Clandon Barrow lozenge could similarly correspond to the solstices at the latitude of Brittany, or to the lunar cycle at the latitude of southern England. When the sides of the Bush Barrow lozenge are aligned with the solstices, the long axis of the lozenge will also point to the equinox sunrise. According to David Dawson, Director of the Wiltshire Museum, the design and precision of the Bush Barrow Lozenge shows that its makers "understood astronomy, geometry and mathematics, 4,000 years ago."

Archaeologist Anthony Johnson argues this understanding of geometry has its origins in the preceding Megalithic/ Henge culture. Euan Mackie, following Alexander Thom, also suggests a Megalithic origin for the knowledge of astronomy. A connection between geometry and astronomy has been noted in the layout of Stonehenge and other Megalithic sites, such as the Crucuno Rectangle in Brittany. According to archaeologist Sabine Gerloff (2007), the use of lozenge and zig-zag forms, which also appear on Bell Beaker pottery and gold lunulae, indicates "a continuation of some Megalithic traditions, beliefs and cult practices into the Early Bronze Age". Lozenges are also depicted on the Folkton Drums, which are thought to represent measuring devices used in the construction Stonehenge and other megalithic monuments. John North has further identified "submultiples of the Megalithic Yard" in the design of the Bush Barrow Lozenge.

Daggers 
David Dawson has stated that: "The gold studs are remarkable evidence of the skill and craftsmanship of Bronze Age goldsmiths – quite rightly described as 'the work of the gods'". Optician Ronald Rabbetts has said that "Only children and teenagers, and those adults who had become myopic naturally or due to the nature of their work as children, would have been able to create and manufacture such tiny objects." 

Scientific analyses indicate that the gold originated from Cornwall. This was also the source of gold used to make the Nebra sky disc and Irish gold lunulae. The dagger may have been made in either Britain or Brittany (Armorica), where similar examples of gold-stud decoration are known. Gold-stud decoration was also used on the amber pommel of a dagger from Hammeldon Down Barrow in Devon, dating from the Wessex II period. 

The hilt of the Bush Barrow dagger lay forgotten for over 40 years from the 1960s, having been sent to Professor Atkinson at Cardiff University, and was found by one of his successors in 2005.

Antique knife 
Some bronze rivets and other bronze fragments have been identified as the remains of a knife dating from about 2400 BC, suggesting that the Bush Barrow chieftain may have belonged to a "noble dynasty" dating back to the time of Stonehenge's construction.

Stone mace 
An unusual stone mace head lay to the right of the Bush Barrow skeleton, made out of a rare fossilized stromatoporoid (sea sponge), originating in Devon or Cornwall. It had a wooden handle, from which decorative zig-zag-shaped bone mounts survive. The mace is considered to be a symbol of power or authority. Similar bone mounts have been found in Grave Circle B at Mycenae in Greece, at Illeta dels Banyets in Spain (associated with the Argaric culture), and in gold form at Carnac in Brittany (associated with the Bell Beaker culture). 

Various authors have suggested a connection between the bone mounts in Britain and those in Greece, where they appear without local antecedents. This is supported by the finding of amber necklaces from Britain in the elite shaft graves at Mycenae (Grave circles A and B). According to Joseph Maran (2013), "In Greece, amber objects first make their appearance in the seventeenth or sixteenth centuries BCE at the very beginning of the Mycenaean period. ... the amber objects had not reached Greece from the Baltic, but, mostly as finished products, from the area of the Wessex culture of southern England. ... There is an amazing similarity between the shaft grave period and the Wessex culture not only in the amber items as such and their close association with gold, but also in the social contexts of the appearance of amber jewellery … in both regions such special amber objects were confined to the very small group of the most richly furnished burials.”  

Close similarities have also been noted between the gold-stud decoration of the Bush Barrow dagger and the decoration of elite weapons in Mycenaean Greece. The gold-stud technique is exclusively attested in Britain, Armorica and Mycenaean Greece, with the oldest examples coming from Britain and Armorica. In Greece this technique, known as 'gold embroidery', first appears in the shaft graves at Mycenae. According to Nikolas Papadimitriou and colleagues (2021), "Mycenaean gold embroidery first occurred in the same context as two other types of artefacts that are considered indicative of northern European links: amber spacer-plates with complex boring and weapons with in‐laid decoration." According to Sabine Gerloff (2007, 2010) the gold-stud technique originated in Britain and was transferred to Greece, along with amber necklaces and zig-zag and lozenge-shaped decorative elements, including the bone mounts from Mycenae. According to Gerloff the gold plating and metal-inlay techniques used on the Nebra sky disc and related artefacts (such as the Thun-Renzenbühl axe) also have their origin in Britain, and are connected to Mycenaean metalwork. Daniel Berger and colleagues (2013) similarly suggest that the Mycenaean metal-inlay technique known as 'double-damascening' may have its origin in northwestern or central Europe.

Wider context 
It is not known why this barrow contained such rich grave goods compared to those around it. It occupies the highest point, but is not the tallest barrow, and is not obviously marked out as the principal barrow in the cemetery. Nonetheless, several other barrows within the Normanton Group contain similarly rich grave goods associated with primary interments, also of a similar age.

See also 
Wessex culture
Unetice culture
Armorican Tumulus culture
Folkton Drums
Stonehenge
Ness of Brodgar

References

External links 

Rethinking Bush Barrow, Archaeology magazine January/February 2009
Bush Barrow page at the Wiltshire Museum website
The Bush Barrow gold lozenge, The Sky at Night, BBC, 8 July 2013

Barrows in the United Kingdom
Sites associated with Stonehenge
Archaeological sites in Wiltshire
Bronze Age art
Bronze Age sites in Wiltshire
1808 archaeological discoveries
Scheduled monuments in Wiltshire